Matías Jonathan Platero (born October 17, 1988) is a professional roller hockey player who plays for Sporting CP.

References

1988 births
Living people
Argentine roller hockey players
Sporting CP roller hockey players